The spoke–hub distribution paradigm is a form of  transport topology optimization in which  traffic planners organize routes as a series of "spokes" that connect outlying points to a central "hub". Simple forms of this distribution/connection model contrast with point-to-point transit systems, in which each point has a direct route to every other point, and which modeled the principal method of transporting passengers and freight until the 1970s. Delta Air Lines pioneered the spoke–hub distribution model in 1955, and the concept revolutionized the  transportation logistics industry after Federal Express demonstrated its value in the early 1970s. In the late 1970s the telecommunications and information technology sector subsequently adopted this distribution topology, dubbing it the star network network topology.

"Hubbing" involves "the arrangement of a transportation network as a hub-and-spoke model".

Benefits

The hub-and-spoke model, as compared to the point-to-point model, requires fewer routes. That compares favourably to the  routes, or O(n2), which would be required to connect each node to every other node in a point-to-point network. For example, in a system with 10 destinations, the spoke–hub system requires only 9 routes to connect all destinations, and a true point-to-point system would require 45 routes. However distance traveled per route will necessarily be more than with a point-to-point system (except where the route happens to have no interchange). Therefore, efficiency may be reduced. Conversely, for a same number of aircraft, having fewer routes to fly means each route can be flown more frequently and with higher capacity because the demand for passengers can be resourced from more than just one city (assuming the passengers are willing to change, which will of itself incur its own costs).

Complicated operations, such as package sorting and accounting, can be carried out at the hub rather than at every node, and this leads to economies of scale. As a result of this, spokes are simpler to operate, and so new routes can easily be created.

Drawbacks
Because the model is centralised, day-to-day operations may be relatively inflexible, and changes at the hub, even in a single route, may have unexpected consequences throughout the network. It may be difficult or even impossible to handle occasional periods of high demand between two spokes. As a result of this, route scheduling is complicated for the network operator, since scarce resources must be used carefully to avoid starving the hub and careful traffic analysis and precise timing are required to keep the hub operating efficiently.

In addition, the hub constitutes a bottleneck or single point of failure in the network. The total cargo capacity of the network is limited by the hub's capacity. Delays at the hub (such as from bad weather conditions) can result in delays throughout the network. Cargo must pass through the hub before reaching its destination and so require longer journeys than direct point-to-point trips. That may be desirable for freight, which can benefit from sorting and consolidating operations at the hub, but it is problematic for time-critical cargo, as well as for passengers. The necessity of baggage transfers at the hub also increases the risk of missing luggage, as compared to the point-to-point model.

Since at least two trips are required to reach destinations other than the hub, distance travelled may be much longer than a direct trip between departure and destination points. The time spent at the hub increases the duration of the journey. Moreover, the importance of the hub operating efficiently means that delays can have more troublesome consequences, such as missing a connecting bus, flight, or train.

Commercial aviation

In 1955, Delta Air Lines pioneered the hub-and-spoke system at its hub in Atlanta, Georgia, in an effort to compete with Eastern Air Lines. In the mid-1970s FedEx adopted the hub-and-spoke model for overnight package delivery. After the airline industry was deregulated in 1978, several other airlines adopted Delta's hub-and-spoke paradigm.

Airlines have extended the hub-and-spoke model in various ways. One method is to create additional hubs on a regional basis and to create major routes between them. That reduces the need to travel long distances between nodes near one another. Another method is to use focus cities to implement point-to-point service for high-traffic routes and to bypass the hub entirely.

Transportation
The spoke–hub model is applicable to other forms of transportation as well:
Sea transport in which feeder ships transport shipping containers from different ports to a central container terminal to be loaded onto larger vessels.
Cargo airlines: most UPS Airlines flights travel through its Worldport at Louisville International Airport, and many FedEx Express parcels are processed at its "SuperHub" at Memphis International Airport.
Freight rail transport in which cargo is hauled to a central exchange terminal. At the terminal, shipping containers are loaded from one freight car to another, and classification yards (marshalling yards) are used to sort freight cars into trains and divide them according to varying destinations. Intermodal freight is often loaded from one mode to another at central hubs.
Public transit uses various transport hubs to allow passengers to transfer between different lines or transportation modes. Often those hubs are intermodal linking buses, trams, local trains, subways and so on.

For passenger road transport, the spoke–hub model does not apply because drivers generally take the shortest or fastest route between two points. However, the road network as a whole likewise contains higher order roads like limited access highways and more local roads with most trips starting and ending at the latter but spending most of the distance on the former.

Industrial distribution
The hub-and-spoke model has also been used in economic geography theory to classify a particular type of industrial district. Economic geographer Ann Markusen theorized about industrial districts, with a number of key industrial firms and facilities acting as a hub, with associated businesses and suppliers benefiting from their presence and arranged around them like the spokes of a wheel. The chief characteristic of such hub-and-spoke industrial districts is the importance of one or more large companies, usually in one industrial sector, surrounded by smaller, associated businesses. Examples of cities with such districts include Seattle (where Boeing was founded), Silicon Valley (a high tech hub), and Toyota City, with Toyota.

East Asian relations

In the sphere of East Asian relations, according to Victor Cha, hub-and-spokes refers to the network of bilateral alliances between United States and other individual East Asian countries. The system constructs a dominant bilateral security architecture in East Asia that is different from the multilateral security architecture in Europe. The US acts as a "hub", and Asian countries like South Korea and Japan are its "spokes". There is a strong alliance between the hub and the spoke, but there are no firmly established connections between the spokes themselves.

This system was inspired by John Foster Dulles, the US Secretary of State from 1953 to 1959. He used the term twice in Tokyo and once at the San Francisco Peace Treaty of September 1951, which led to talks for bilateral peace treaty between the US and Japan.

The 1951 Security Treaty Between the United States and Japan, the 1953 U.S.–South Korea Status of Forces Agreement and the 1954 Sino-American Mutual Defense Treaty (later replaced by the Taiwan Relations Act) are some examples of such bilateral relations.

In April 2014, all ten ASEAN defense chiefs and United States Secretary of Defense Chuck Hagel attended the US–ASEAN Defense Forum in Hawaii. That was the first time the US hosted the forum. It was part of a US attempt to get the countries to strengthen military ties between themselves.

See also
Hub and spokes architecture
Hubs and nodes
Roundabout (traffic circle)
Foreign policy of the United States for an example of international coordination through a third country.
Ville Radieuse

References

Further reading
 Badcock, B. A., 2002, Making Sense of Cities: A Geographical Survey, London: Arnold, pp. 63–94.
 Lawrence, H., 2004, "Aviation and the Role of Government", London: Kendall Hunt, pp. 227–230.
 

Freight transport